KENT may refer to:
KENT (AM), a radio station (1540 AM) licensed to serve Enterprise, Nevada, United States
KAZZ (AM), a radio station (1400 AM) licensed to serve Parowan, Utah, United States, which held the call sign KENT from 2004 to 2014

See also 
 Kent (disambiguation)